The Church of St Mary and St Thomas is one of two Anglican churches in Knebworth, Hertfordshire, England. The church dates from the twelfth century and is a grade I listed building.

History

Site
The church is set in a churchyard which in turn is surrounded by parkland. 
Like a number of Norman churches in the area (for example, St Nicholas' Church, Stevenage; All Saints, Datchworth), the site is on a hill. Archaeological investigations have identified traces of an early settlement between the church and Knebworth House.  It is believed that the settlement was abandoned when the park was created in c. 1300.

In 1914 work started on a new church, St Martin's, to serve the main population centre of Knebworth, but St Mary and St Thomas has remained in use.

Architecture
The architectural historian Nikolaus Pevsner described the exterior of the church as "architecturally insignificant".  The most prominent feature is the tower, surmounted by a short spire typical of the region called a "Hertfordshire spike".(see note)

Features of interest inside the church include a Norman chancel arch.

Memorials
The church houses memorials to the Lytton family. Until the construction of the Lytton Mausoleum in Knebworth Park, the Lytton family used the Lytton Chapel for interments. The chapel is attached to the north side of the church and was rebuilt around 1710 to house three exceptionally fine monuments dedicated to members of the family.

The churchyard has several war graves and a listed tomb by Edwin Lutyens.

Conservation
On 27 May 1968, the church was designated a grade I listed building.
It is included in the Old Knebworth Conservation Area.

Present day
The church still uses the Book of Common Prayer for its services. The church is part of the parish of Knebworth in the Archdeaconry of Hertford of the Diocese of St Albans.

See also
 Lytton Mausoleum

Notes
1.Flèche or short spire rising from a church-tower, its base concealed by a parapet, common in Herts., England.  Pevsner, N., Cherry. BoE, Hertfordshire. (1977)

References

Sources

External links

 Parish website

Knebworth
Knebworth
Knebworth
Knebworth
Works of Edwin Lutyens in England
Knebworth